Safe from Harm the second album from Dusted, was released in 2005. It was a reworking of the outfit's 2001 debut, and was accompanied by an 80-page, illustrated hardcover book with the same name.

Track listing
"In the Beginning" – 4:06
"Time Takes Time" – 5:28
"Hurt U" – 2:31
"Always Remember to Respect & Honour Your Mother, Part 1" – 4:08
"Rest" – 2:57
"Biggest Fool in the World" – 3:30
"Always Remember to Respect & Honour Your Mother, Part 2" – 4:19
"Winter" – 5:32
"Oscar Song" – 2:04
"In Memoriam" – 1:18
"Under the Sun" – 5:13
"If I Had Child" – 8:15

External links 
Official site
Jukebox:Safe from Harm
Rollo Armstrong Publishes Kids Book for Adults
Dusted - Always Remember To Respect And Honour Your Mother Part 1

2005 albums
Dusted (British band) albums
Albums produced by Rollo Armstrong